2018 DRC Ebola virus outbreak could mean:

 2018 Équateur province Ebola outbreak
 2018 Kivu Ebola outbreak